Brimson may refer to:
 Brimson, Missouri
 Brimson, Minnesota
 Brimson (surname)